This is a list of people killed by non-military law enforcement officers in Poland, both on duty and off, and regardless of reason or method. Inclusion in the lists implies neither wrongdoing nor justification on the part of the person killed or the officer involved; the listing merely documents the occurrence of a death.

Since 1990

1945–1990

1918–1939

See also 
 Lists of killings by law enforcement officers

References 

Poland
Poland
Poland-related lists
Law enforcement in Poland